Empirical research is research using empirical evidence. It is also a way of gaining knowledge by means of direct and indirect observation or experience. Empiricism values some research more than other kinds. Empirical evidence (the record of one's direct observations or experiences) can be analyzed quantitatively or qualitatively. Quantifying the evidence or making sense of it in qualitative form, a researcher can answer empirical questions, which should be clearly defined and answerable with the evidence collected (usually called data). Research design varies by field and by the question being investigated. Many researchers combine qualitative and quantitative forms of analysis to better answer questions that cannot be studied in laboratory settings, particularly in the social sciences and in education.

In some fields, quantitative research may begin with a research question (e.g., "Does listening to vocal music during the learning of a word list have an effect on later memory for these words?") which is tested through experimentation. Usually,  the researcher has a certain theory regarding the topic under investigation. Based on this theory, statements or hypotheses will be proposed (e.g., "Listening to vocal music has a negative effect on learning a word list."). From these hypotheses, predictions about specific events are derived (e.g., "People who study a word list while listening to vocal music will remember fewer words on a later memory test than people who study a word list in silence."). These predictions can then be tested with a suitable experiment. Depending on the outcomes of the experiment, the theory on which the hypotheses and predictions were based will be supported or not, or may need to be modified and then subjected to further testing.

Terminology
The term empirical was originally used to refer to certain ancient Greek practitioners of medicine who rejected adherence to the dogmatic doctrines of the day, preferring instead to rely on the observation of phenomena as perceived in experience. Later empiricism referred to a theory of knowledge in philosophy which adheres to the principle that knowledge arises from experience and evidence gathered specifically using the senses. In scientific use, the term empirical refers to the gathering of data using only evidence that is observable by the senses or in some cases using calibrated scientific instruments. What early philosophers described as empiricist and empirical research have in common is the dependence on observable data to formulate and test theories and come to conclusions.

Usage
The researcher attempts to describe accurately the interaction between the instrument (or the human senses) and the entity being observed. If instrumentation is involved, the researcher is expected to calibrate his/her instrument by applying it to known standard objects and documenting the results before applying it to unknown objects. In other words, it describes the research that has not taken place before and their results.

In practice, the accumulation of evidence for or against any particular theory involves planned research designs for the collection of empirical data, and academic rigor plays a large part of judging the merits of research design. Several typologies for such designs have been suggested, one of the most popular of which comes from Campbell and Stanley. They are responsible for popularizing the widely cited distinction among pre-experimental, experimental, and quasi-experimental designs and are staunch advocates of the central role of randomized experiments in educational research.

Scientific research 
Accurate analysis of data using standardized statistical methods in scientific studies is critical to determining the validity of empirical research. Statistical formulas such as regression, uncertainty coefficient, t-test, chi square, and various types of ANOVA (analyses of variance) are fundamental to forming logical, valid conclusions. If empirical data reach significance under the appropriate statistical formula, the research hypothesis is supported. If not, the null hypothesis is supported (or, more accurately, not rejected), meaning no effect of the independent variable(s) was observed on the dependent variable(s).

The outcome of empirical research using statistical hypothesis testing is never proof. It can only support a hypothesis, reject it, or do neither. These methods yield only probabilities. Among scientific researchers, empirical evidence (as distinct from empirical research) refers to objective evidence that appears the same regardless of the observer. For example, a thermometer will not display different temperatures for each individual who observes it. Temperature, as measured by an accurate, well calibrated thermometer, is empirical evidence. By contrast, non-empirical evidence is subjective, depending on the observer. Following the previous example, observer A might truthfully report that a room is warm, while observer B might truthfully report that the same room is cool, though both observe the same reading on the thermometer. The use of empirical evidence negates this effect of personal (i.e., subjective) experience or time.

The varying perception of empiricism and rationalism shows concern with the limit to which there is dependency on experience of sense as an effort of gaining knowledge. According to rationalism, there are a number of different ways in which sense experience is gained independently for the knowledge and concepts. According to empiricism, sense experience is considered as the main source of every piece of knowledge and the concepts. 
In general, rationalists are known for the development of their own views following two different way. First, the key argument can be placed that there are cases in which the content of knowledge or concepts end up outstripping the information. This outstripped information is provided by the sense experience (Hjørland, 2010, 2). Second, there is construction of accounts as to how reasoning helps in the provision of addition knowledge about a specific or broader scope. Empiricists are known to be presenting complementary senses related to thought. 

First, there is development of accounts of how there is provision of information by experience that is cited by rationalists. This is insofar for having it in the initial place. At times, empiricists tend to be opting skepticism as an option of rationalism. If experience is not helpful in the provision of knowledge or concept cited by rationalists, then they do not exist (Pearce, 2010, 35). Second, empiricists hold the tendency of attacking the accounts of rationalists while considering reasoning to be an important source of knowledge or concepts. The overall disagreement between empiricists and rationalists shows primary concerns in how there is gaining of knowledge with respect to the sources of knowledge and concept. In some of the cases, disagreement at the point of gaining knowledge results in the provision of conflicting responses to other aspects as well. There might be a disagreement in the overall feature of warrant, while limiting the knowledge and thought. Empiricists are known for sharing the view that there is no existence of innate knowledge and rather that is derivation of knowledge out of experience. These experiences are either reasoned using the mind or sensed through the five senses human possess (Bernard, 2011, 5). On the other hand, rationalists are known to be sharing the view that there is existence of innate knowledge and this is different for the objects of innate knowledge being chosen. 

In order to follow rationalism, there must be adoption of one of the three claims related to the theory that are deduction or intuition, innate knowledge, and innate concept. The more there is removal of concept from mental operations and experience, there can be performance over experience with increased plausibility in being innate. Further ahead, empiricism in context with a specific subject provides a rejection of the corresponding version related to innate knowledge and deduction or intuition (Weiskopf, 2008, 16). Insofar as there is acknowledgement of concepts and knowledge within the area of subject, the knowledge has major dependence on experience through human senses.

Empirical cycle

A.D. de Groot's empirical cycle:
 Observation: The observation of a phenomenon and inquiry concerning its causes.
 Induction: The formulation of hypotheses - generalized explanations for the phenomenon.
 Deduction: The formulation of experiments that will test the hypotheses (i.e. confirm them if true, refute them if false). 
 Testing: The procedures by which the hypotheses are tested and data are collected.
 Evaluation: The interpretation of the data and the formulation of a theory - an abductive argument that presents the results of the experiment as the most reasonable explanation for the phenomenon.

See also 
 Case study
 Fact
 Field research
 Scientific method

References

External links 
 
 Some Key Concepts for the Design and Review of Empirical Research

Research
Research
Concepts in epistemology
Epistemology of science